A subject-matter expert (SME) is a person who has accumulated great knowledge in a particular field or topic and this level of knowledge is demonstrated by the person's degree, licensure, and/or through years of professional experience with the subject, i.e. a PhD in chemistry could be easily declared as an SME in chemistry, or a person with a Second Class Radio Telegraph License (or equivalent) issued by the national licensing body (Federal Communications Commission in the United States, Ofcom in the UK, and National Telecommunications Commission in the Philippines, and other authorities around the world) could be considered an SME in radio telegraph.  A person with a master's degree in electronic engineering could be considered a subject matter expert in electronics, or a person with many years of experience in machining could be considered a subject matter expert in machining.

The term is used when developing materials about a topic (a book, an examination, a manual, etc.), and expertise on the topic is needed by the personnel developing the material. For example, tests are often created by a team of psychometricians and a team of SMEs. The psychometricians understand how to engineer a test while the SMEs understand the actual content of the exam. Books, manuals, and technical documentation are developed by technical writers and instructional designers in conjunctions with SMEs. Technical communicators interview SMEs to extract information and convert it into a form suitable for the audience. SMEs are often required to sign off on the documents or training developed, checking it for technical accuracy. SMEs are also necessary for the development of training materials.

By field 
In pharmaceutical and biotechnology areas, ASTM International standard E2500 specifies SMEs for various functions in project and process management. In one project, there will be many SMEs who are experts on air, water, utilities, process machines, process, packaging, storage, distribution and supply chain management.
"Subject Matter Experts are defined as those individuals with specific expertise and responsibility in a particular area or field (for example, quality unit, engineering, automation, development, operations). Subject Matter Experts should take the lead role in the verification of manufacturing systems as appropriate within their area of expertise and responsibility." —ASTM E2500 §6.7.1 and §6.7.2.

In engineering and technical fields, a SME is the one who is an authority in the design concept, calculations and performance of a system or process.

In the scientific and academic fields, subject matter experts are recruited to perform peer reviews and are used as oversight personnel to review reports in the accounting and financial fields.

A lawyer in an administrative agency may be designated an SME if they specialize in a particular field of law, such as tort, intellectual property rights, etc. A law firm may seek out and use an SME as an expert witness.

In electronic discovery environments, the term "SME" labels professionals with expertise using computer-assisted reviewing technology and technology-assisted review (TAR) to perform searches designed to produce precisely refined results that identify groups of data as potentially responsive or non-responsive to relevant issues. E-discovery SMEs also typically have experience in constructing the search strings used in the search. It also refers to experts used to "train" the TAR systems.

Domain expert (software)

A domain expert is frequently used in expert systems software development, and there the term always refers to the domain other than the software domain. A domain expert is a person with special knowledge or skills in a particular area of endeavour (e.g. an accountant is an expert in the domain of accountancy). The development of accounting software requires knowledge in two different domains: accounting and software. Some of the development workers may be experts in one domain and not the other.

In software engineering environments, the term is used to describe professionals with expertise in the field of application. The term "SME" also has a broader definition in engineering and high tech as one who has the greatest expertise in a technical topic. SMEs are often asked to review, improve, and approve technical work; to guide others; and to teach. According to Six Sigma, an SME "exhibits the highest level of expertise in performing a specialized job, task, or skill of broad definition."

In software development, as in the development of "complex computer systems" (e.g., artificial intelligence, expert systems, control, simulation, or business software), a SME is a person who is knowledgeable about the domain being represented (but often not knowledgeable about the programming technology used to represent it in the system). The SME tells the software developers what needs to be done by the computer system, and how the SME intends to use it. The SME may interact directly with the system, possibly through a simplified interface, or may codify domain knowledge for use by knowledge engineers or ontologists. A SME is also involved in validating the resulting system. SME has formal meaning in certain contexts, such as Capability Maturity Models.

See also
Advisor
Consultant
 
 Knowledge engineering 
Professional
Subject-matter expert Turing test

References

Further reading
 Maintenance of KBS's by Domain Experts, Bultman, Kuipers, Harmelen (2005)

Knowledge engineering
Skills
Knowledge